Sonia Bazanta Vides (born 1 August 1940), better known as Totó la Momposina, is a Colombian singer of Afro-Colombian and Indigenous descent. She reached international attention with the release of her 1993 album La Candela Viva on Peter Gabriel's Real World Records label. Totó accompanied Gabriel García Márquez to receive the Nobel Prize in Literature in 1982 as part of a Colombian cultural delegation performing during the award ceremony.

Biography
Totó was born in the northern Colombian town of Talaigua Nuevo near Mompox in the Bolívar Department. She is from the fourth generation of her family to be involved with music. Her father was a drummer and her mother was a singer and dancer.

She studied at the National University of Colombia. She then studied for a year at the Sorbonne in Paris.

She received the Latin Grammy Lifetime Achievement Award in 2013.

In 2017, she was awarded an honorary doctorate from the National Pedagogic University in Colombia.

Discography
 Cantadora (MTM Auvidisc, 1983)
 Colombia – Totó La Momposina y sus Tambores (Auvidis 4513, 1989)
 La Candela Viva (Realworld Records 31, 1992)
 Carmelina (MTM, 1995)
 Pacantó (Colombia: MTM/Europe:Nuevos Medios/USA: World Village, 2000)
 Gaita y Tambores
 Total: 2-disc compilation
La Luna (Armada Deep, 2016) with Jude & Frank

Notable usage
 Michel Cleis feat – Totó La Momposina – La Mezcla – samples tracks "El Pescador" and "Curura" from the La Candela Viva album (2009)
 Two songs from La Candela Viva were included on the soundtrack of the 1997 movie Jungle 2 Jungle.
 Her song "La Verdolaga" was sampled on Rich Boy's "Get to Poppin'" produced by Brian Kidd.  It has also been sampled by Jay Z for the song "Blue's Freestyle/We Family" on his 4:44 album.  The song featured his daughter Blue Ivy Carter.  The track was released as a bonus song several weeks after the albums original public release.
 Two of her songs, "La Verdolaga" and "Mohana", were featured in the soundtrack for John Sayles' 1997 movie, Men With Guns.
 Her song "La Verdolaga" was covered on P18 (band)'s "Urban Cuban'" in 1999.
 Her 1993 Colombian cumbia classic "Curura" was sampled by Major Lazer featuring J Balvin in the song titled "Que Calor".

Awards and nominations

Grammy Awards

|-
| 2015 || El Asunto || Best Tropical Latin Album || 
|-

Latin Grammy Awards
Totó la Momposina has two Latin Grammy awards from four nominations for her collaboration with the urban group Calle 13 on their song "Latinoamérica", receiving in 2013 the lifetime achievement award.

|-
| 2000 || Pacantó || Best Folk Album || 
|-
| 2002 || Pacantó || Best Traditional Tropical Album || 
|-
| 2009 || La Bodega || Best Traditional Tropical Album || 
|-
| style="text-align:center;" rowspan="2"|2011 || "Latinoamérica" || Record of the Year || 
|-
|"Latinoamérica" || Song of the Year || 
|-
| 2013 || Special Awards || Lifetime Achievement Award || 
|-
| 2014 || El Asunto || Best Folk Album || 
|-

Premios Nuestra Tierra
A Premio Nuestra Tierra is an accolade that recognize outstanding achievement in the Colombian music industry. Totó la Momposina has received a nomination.

|-
| style="text-align:center;" rowspan="1"|2014 || "La Candela Viva" (with Jorge Celedón) || Best Folk Performance of the Year  ||

See also
Music of Colombia

References

External links
 Totó La Momposina official website
 Indigenous Cactus Flutes, Afro-Colombian Drums and Brass Bands – Totó La Momposina Puts Colombia's Soul on the World Stage

Living people
20th-century Colombian women singers
Cumbia musicians
Real World Records artists
1948 births
Latin Grammy Lifetime Achievement Award winners
Sony Music Colombia artists
Women in Latin music
National University of Colombia alumni